The seventh and final season of Workaholics premiered on Comedy Central at 10/9c on January 11 and ended its run of 10 episodes on March 15, 2017.

Cast

Main

Starring
Blake Anderson as Blake Henderson
Adam DeVine as Adam DeMamp
Anders Holm as Anders "Ders" Holmvik

Also starring
Jillian Bell as Jillian Belk
Erik Griffin as Montez Walker
Maribeth Monroe as Alice Murphy

Recurring
Kyle Newacheck as Karl Hevacheck
Bill Stevenson as Bill

Guest
Nina Dobrev as Courtnee
Dennis Quaid as Ted Murphy
Topher Grace as Noel
Chuck Liddell as Uncle Mike
Cary Elwes as Fox
Tom Wilson as Barnes
Elden Henson as Nipples
Mo Collins as Bianca Toro
Craig Kilborn as Kurt Fossil
Jason Mantzoukas as Isaac Lubetkin
Jack Quaid as Clark
Tony Revolori as Dougie
Paul Scheer as Fest Manager
Amanda Payton as Megan

Production
On July 5, 2015, Comedy Central renewed Workaholics for a sixth and seventh season respectively. The final season was confirmed on November 3, 2016 after Adam DeVine first hinted back in July that year about Season 7 being the last at the time he along with Anderson and Holm were already preparing to move on to other projects.

Episodes

Notes

References

External links
 
 

2017 American television seasons